Jewell is an English surname, from a Celtic personal name composed of elements meaning ‘lord’ + ‘generous’, ‘bountiful’.  The name does not derive from the homophone “jewel.” 

Notable people with this surname include the following:

Surname
Archie Jewell (1888–1917), English sailor who survived the sinking of the Titanic
Arthur Jewell (1888–1922), English cricketer
Buddy Jewell, country music singer
Eilen Jewell, American singer, band-leader and songwriter based in Boise, Idaho
Fred Jewell (1875–1936), composer and circus musician 
Geri Jewell, American actress
Isabel Jewell (1907–1972), American film actress
Jake Jewell, American baseball player
James Jewell (1906–1975), American radio actor, producer and director
Jennyfer Jewell, New Zealand television actress
Jerry Jewell, American voice actor
Jimmy Jewell (association football), English football manager
Jimmy Jewell (saxophonist) (born 1945)
John Jewel or Jewell (1522–1571), Bishop of Salisbury, England
John Jewell (South African cricketer) (1891–1966)
Josey Jewell (born 1994), American football player
Lisa Jewell, British novelist
Marshall Jewell (1825–1883), Governor of Connecticut
Maurice Jewell (1885–1978), English cricketer
Nick Jewell, Australian footballer and cricketer
Norman Jewell (1913–2004), Royal Naval officer notable for his involvement in the World War II Operation Mincemeat
Paul Jewell (born 1964), English footballer and manager
Philip "Jimmy" Jewell (1953–1987), Welsh rock climber
Richard Jewell (1962–2007), American security guard falsely accused in the bombing of the 1996 Olympic Games
Richard G. Jewell, president of Grove City College
Richard Roach Jewell (1810–1891), architect
Sally Jewell, former United States Secretary of the Interior and CEO of REI
Seb Jewell (born 1987), English rugby union player
Slater Jewell-Kemker (born 1992), American-Canadian filmmaker and climate activist
Theodore Frelinghuysen Jewell (1844–1932), Rear Admiral, United States Navy
Tony Jewell (footballer) (born 1943), former Australian rules football player
Tyler Jewell (born 1977), American snowboarder 
William S. Jewell (1867–1956), American lawyer and politician
William Jewell (educator) (1789–1852), founder of William Jewell College in Missouri, US

Given name
Jewell is also occasionally used as a given name (or stage name), peaking in the late 1800s and early 1900s as a unisex given name (like ‘Taylor,’ or ‘Jordan’ in more recent times). 

Jewell Jones, American politician
Jewell (singer), R&B singer signed to Death Row Records in the early 1990s
Jewell Jackson McCabe (born 1945), founder of the National Coalition of 100 Black Women

See also
Jewelle Gomez (born 1948), American feminist writer

English-language surnames